Tanner Foust (born June 13, 1973) is an American professional racing driver, stunt driver, and television host. He competes in rally, drift, ice racing, time attack, hill climb and rallycross with multiple podium placements, national championships, and world records. He was a co-host of the American version of the motoring television series Top Gear.

Background
Growing up in a naval family, Foust spent several years as a child in Scotland, where he discovered rallying  and learned to drive on the country roads near his home. He returned to the United States and worked jobs as a golf caddy and school bus driver, from which he was fired, and went into a pre-med track at the University of Colorado, earning a biology degree. He spent his summers at the track, trading mechanic work and driver coaching jobs for seat time in racecars. After college, he began working as an ice driving coach, an instructor at automotive marketing events and competing in anything he could, including rally and drifting. He made the transition to professional racing in 2003, and soon moved to California to begin stunt driving for Hollywood films. With his passion for cars, he has rapidly become one of the busiest professional drivers in the United States. He considers himself fortunate that, in just over ten years of professional racing, he has had the opportunity to compete against the likes of Rod Millen, Colin McRae, Michael Schumacher, Jenson Button and Sebastian Vettel.

Career
He was slated to become co-host for the original American version of the motoring television series, Top Gear, on NBC and filmed a pilot before the series was dropped. The series has since been picked up by the History Channel and Foust was the only pilot presenter to be picked up when the program finally made it on air in the U.S. in late 2010. He has also hosted other shows including SPEED Channel's SuperCars Exposed, SPEED Channel's Redline TV and ESPN's Import Tuners. On November 21, 2010, he made his debut for the History Channel series, Top Gear, the American version of the BBC hit series of the same name.

Foust has been a stunt driver for films such as The Fast and the Furious Tokyo Drift, Ford vs Ferrari, Need For Speed and The Dukes of Hazzard and set multiple world records with Hot Wheels and Top Gear. He was a prominent competitor in the Formula Drift series, winning the 2007 and 2008 championship. Foust is the first driver in Formula Drift history to win back-to-back series championships. He is the most decorated driver in X Games history with 9 medals. Foust first competed in X Games XIII in 2007 where he won the gold in the rally racing event. He also participated in Rally America in 2009. In 2010 at X Games XVI he won gold in Rally Car Racing and Rally Car Super Rally, driving the Rockstar Energy Ford Fiesta. He also competed in the European Rallycross Championship, becoming the first American to do so. After leaving the drifting scene in favor of RallyCross in 2011, Foust became a regular ERC competitor, taking part in 9 of the 10 rounds of the FIA recognized series finished second overall as well as Global RallyCross - winning the championship. In 2012, Foust continued his success with another Global RallyCross championship.

For 2013, Foust medaled in both racing events at X Games XIX Los Angeles with a gold in Gymkhana Grid and silver in RallyCross. These marked his eighth and ninth X Games medals.

In Summer 2015 he started shooting the sixth and final season of Top Gear completing 72 episodes.

At the Chicago Auto Show in February 2014, Foust announced a new partnership with Volkswagen and Andretti Autosport. He drove a Volkswagen New Beetle for the 2014 Global RallyCross Championship season as well as selected events with Marklund Motorsport in the inaugural season of the FIA World Rallycross Championship. He became the first, and so far only, driver from outside Europe to win a round of the championship, winning the 2014 World RX of Finland. As the US rallycross series has changed its name from Global Rallycross to America’s Rallycross and Nitro Rallycross, Foust has finished runner up in the championship 3 times and won the NRX championship in 2019. He holds the longest running streak of Heat victories in rallycross worldwide at 25 and is currently the winningest driver in the US.

Foust signed with McLaren XE to race in the 2022 Extreme E season alongside Emma Gilmour. He and Gilmour won McLaren's first Extreme E podium by finishing second in the Energy X-Prix.

Achievements

 Rally America

 2005 Rally America - PGT Champion (Subaru WRX)
 2006 Rally America - PGT Class Championship Second place overall (Subaru WRX)
 2007 Rally America - Fourth Place (with 6 podium placements)

 X Games

 2006 X Games - Rally Third fastest time in the Stadium Super Special
 2007 X Games - Rally Gold Medalist (Subaru STI)
 2008 X Games - Rally Silver Medalist (Subaru STI)
 2009 X Games - Rally Bronze Medalist (Ford Fiesta)
 2010 X Games - Super Rally Gold Medalist (Ford Fiesta)
 2010 X Games - Rally Gold Medalist (Ford Fiesta)
 2011 X Games - RallyCross Silver Medal (Ford Fiesta)
 2013 X Games Munich - RallyCross Bronze Medalist Ford Fiesta) 
 2013 X Games Los Angeles - Gymkhana Grid Gold Medalist (Ford Fiesta) 
 2013 X Games Los Angeles - RallyCross Silver Medalist (Ford Fiesta) 

 Rallycross championships

 2011 European Rallycross Championship - Silver Medalist (Ford Fiesta)
 2011 Global RallyCross Championship - Champion (Ford Fiesta)
 2012 Global RallyCross Championship - Champion (Ford Fiesta)
 2018 Americas Rallycross Championship - Silver Medalist (Volkswagen Beetle)
 2019 Americas Rallycross Championship - Champion (Volkswagen Beetle)

 Formula D

 2006 Formula Drift - 3rd place overall (Nissan Silvia)
 2007 Formula Drift - Champion (Nissan 350Z)
 2008 Formula Drift - Champion (Nissan 350Z)
 2009 Formula Drift - 6th Place (Scion TC)
 2010 Formula Drift - Silver Medalist (Scion TC)

 Other

 2009 Race of Champions - Nations Cup semi-finalist
 2010 Gymkhana Grid Gold Medalist AWD Division (Ford Fiesta) 
 2011 World record for longest jump in a four-wheeled vehicle (332 feet)
 2011 World indoor speed record (until February 2013)
 2012 World record for largest loop-the-loop in a car (60 feet in diameter)

Racing record

Complete FIA European Rallycross Championship results
(key)

Division 1

Supercar

Complete FIA World Rallycross Championship results
(key)

Supercar

Complete Global RallyCross Championship results
(key)

AWD

Supercar

Complete Americas Rallycross Championship results

Complete Nitro Rallycross results

Complete Extreme E results
(key)

* Season still in progress.

TV and film

 The Dukes of Hazzard (2005) stunt driver
 Rally America (2005–2007) as Himself
 Formula D (2005–2007) as Himself
 Auto Access (2005–2007) Host
 Import Racers: "Bull Run" (2006) as Himself
 CSI: Miami: "Driven" (2006) stunt driver
 Fast & Furious: Tokyo Drift (2006) stunt driver
 Master of Champions: "Premiere" (2006) Contestant
 RM Classic Car Auction (2007) Host
 Redline TV (2007) Host
 Dirt: "Ita Missa Est" (2007) stunt double
 The Bourne Ultimatum (2007) stunt performer
 Numb3rs: "Velocity" (2007) stunt driver
 Top Gear (NBC) (2008) Host
 Mad Skills: Rhys Millen Is the Kiwi Drifter (2008) as Himself
 SuperCars Exposed (2008–2009) Host
 Fast & Furious (2009) stunt double
 Street Customs: "GTO" (2009) as Himself
 Battle of the Supercars (2010) as Himself
 Iron Man 2 (2010) stunt double
 Top Gear (U.S.) (2010—2016) Host
 Hot Wheels: Fearless at the 500 (2011) as Himself
 Red Dawn (2012) stunt double
 The Bourne Legacy (2012) stunt double
 Octane Academy (2012) as Himself
 Octane Academy (2013) as Himself
 Need for Speed (2014) stunt driver
 Hitman: Agent 47 (2015) hitman stunt driver
 Straight Outta Compton (2015) Stunt Driver
 Ford v Ferrari (2019) Ronnie Bucknum

Notes

References

External links

 
 Papadakis Racing Tanner Foust Bio
 Scion Racing About Team Rockstar
 Rockstar Racing Tanner Foust Bio
 

1973 births
American rally drivers
American stunt performers
Andretti Autosport drivers
Audi Sport TT Cup drivers
D1 Grand Prix drivers
Dreyer & Reinbold Racing drivers
Drifting drivers
European Rallycross Championship drivers
Extreme E drivers
Formula D drivers
Global RallyCross Championship drivers
Living people
McLaren Racing drivers
Racing drivers from Colorado
Racing drivers from Denver
World Rallycross Championship drivers
X Games athletes